The Somerset Range is a low mountain range comprising the mountains/hills between Nitinat Lake and Barkley Sound's Imperial Eagle Channel on northern Vancouver Island, British Columbia, Canada. It has an area of 203 km2 and is a subrange of the Vancouver Island Ranges which in turn form part of the Insular Mountains.

See also
List of mountain ranges

References

Vancouver Island Ranges
Mountain ranges of British Columbia